"Don't Turn Out the Lights" is a song by American vocal groups New Kids on the Block and Backstreet Boys from their collaboration compilation album, NKOTBSB. The song's lead vocals are provided by NKOTB members Joey McIntyre, Donnie Wahlberg, and Jordan Knight, and every Backstreet Boys member at the time. The song was written by Jess Cates, Claude Kelly, Emanuel Kiriakou, and produced by Kiriakou.

A sneak preview of "Don't Turn Out the Lights" was played by Backstreet Boys members Brian Littrell and A. J. McLean on the Backstreet Boys 2010 Cruise and was leaked to the internet on April 1, 2011. On April 5, 2011, the song premiered on On Air With Ryan Seacrest and was released to iTunes in the US and Canada as the lead single from the album by Legacy Recordings. The single debuted at number 14 on the US Billboard Bubbling Under Hot 100 Singles chart on April 14, 2011.

Track listing
 Digital download
 "Don't Turn Out the Lights" – 3:31

German CD single
 "Don't Turn Out the Lights" – 3:33
 "Don't Turn Out the Lights" (Instrumental) – 3:30

Charts

References

2011 singles
Backstreet Boys songs
New Kids on the Block songs
Songs written by Jess Cates
Songs written by Claude Kelly
Songs written by Emanuel Kiriakou
2011 songs